This article details the Castleford Tigers rugby league football club's 2021 season.
During the season, they will compete in Super League XXVI and the 2021 Challenge Cup.

Pre Season

  

All fixtures are subject to change

Super League

  

All fixtures are subject to change

Challenge Cup

  

All fixtures are subject to change

2022 squad

2021 transfers

Gains

Losses

Notes

Player statistics

Top Try Scorers

Top Goal Scorers

Top Points Scorers

 Updated to match(es) played on 2 May 2021

References

External links 
 

Castleford Tigers seasons
Super League XXVI by club